The Western Tatras are mountains in the Tatras, part of the Carpathian Mountains, located on the Polish-Slovak borders. The mountains border the High Tatras in the east, Podtatranská kotlina in the south, Choč Mountains in the west and Rów Podtatrzański in the north. The main ridge is 37 kilometers long and the mountain range contains 31 two-thousanders.

Western Tatras are the second highest mountain range both in Poland and Slovakia; its highest peak is Bystrá at 2,248 meters. Other notable mountains include Jakubiná (2,194 m), Baranec (2,184 m), Baníkov (2,178 m), Tri kopy (2,136.3 m), Plačlivé (2,125.1 m), Ostrý Roháč (2,087.5 m), Volovec (Polish: Wołowiec; 2,064 m), Kasprowy Wierch (Slovak: Kasprov vrch; 1,987 m) and Giewont (1,894 m). In Slovakia, they are partially located in the traditional regions of Liptov and Orava. The highest point in Poland is Starorobociański Wierch (2,176 m).

Division 
The Western Tatras are subdivided into 6 regions on the Slovak side and 4 on the Polish side.

Slovak Western Tatras:
 Osobitá (highest point: Osobitá, 1 687 m)
 Sivý vrch (highest point: Sivý vrch, 1 805 m)
 Liptovské Tatry (highest point: Bystrá, 2 248 m)
 Roháče (highest point: Baníkov, 2 178 m)
 Červené vrchy (highest point: Kresanica / Krzesanica, 2 122 m)
 Liptovské kopy (highest point: Veľká kopa, 2 052 m)
Polish Western Tatras:
 Grześ
 Kasprowy Wierch
 Czerwone Wierchy (corresponds to Červené vrchy, highest point: Kresanica / Krzesanica, 2 122 m)
 Ornak

Geology and ecology 
The Western Tatras are protected by Tatranský národný park in Slovakia and Tatrzański Park Narodowy in Poland.

Peaks 
The following is a list of the highest 10 of the 31 two-thousanders in Western Tatras:

Saddles (cols) 
 Pálenica (1 570 m)
 Parichvost (1 870 m)
 Baníkovské sedlo (2 045 m)
 Smutné sedlo (1 965 m)
 Žiarske sedlo (1 917,1 m)
 Jamnícke sedlo (1 908 m)
 Račkovo sedlo (1 958 m)
 Gáborovo sedlo (1 890 m)
 Bystré sedlo (1 960 m)
 Pyšné sedlo (1 791,6 m)
 Tomanovské sedlo (1 685,9 m)
 Ľaliové sedlo (1 951,8 m)

Tarns 
There are approximately 20 to 32 tarns in Western Tatras. The exact number is difficult to obtain because of lack of an exact definition and because it is sometimes hard to prove what is a tarn and what is not. The following is a list of 15 largest tarns in Western Tatras:

Caves 
 Jaskinia Wielka Śnieżna, the largest and deepest cave in Poland
 Brestovská cave, uniquely features an underground river

Tourism 
There are four tourist centers inside the Western Tatras area: Zverovka, Brestová and Ťatliakova chata in the northern region and  Žiarska chata in the southern region. All other tourist centers lie at the outside borders of the mountains, including: Oravice, Zuberec, Bobrovecká vápenica, Žiar, Konská, Jakubovany-Studená dolina, Pribylina, Podbanské.

See also 
 Eastern Tatras – mountain range bordering the Western Tatras in the east
 Mountain Rescue Service (Slovakia)
 Tatra National Park, Poland
 Tatra National Park, Slovakia
 Tourism in Slovakia

References 

 Touristic map 1:25000 Západné Tatry - Podbanské - Zverovka, VKÚ a.s. Harmanec, 2008

External links 

 SummitPost.org: Western Tatras

 
Tatra Mountains
Tatra, West
Tatra, West
Tatras, West
Tatra, West
Tatras, West
Tatra, West